Minuscule 154 (in the Gregory-Aland numbering), Θε402 (Soden), is a Greek minuscule manuscript of the New Testament, on cotton paper. Palaeographically it has been assigned to the 13th-century. It has complex contents, and full marginalia.

Description
The codex contains a complete text of the four Gospels on 355 paper leaves (size ), with a Theophylact's commentary.

The text is written in one column per page, in 40 lines per page. The paper has brown colour, written in black ink, capital letters in red.

The references to the Eusebian Canons are absent.

It contains lectionary markings at the margin (for liturgical use), liturgical books with hagiographies (Synaxarion and Menologion), numbers of stichoi, and subscriptions at the end of each Gospel.

At the end of the manuscript is given subscription α υ μ β απριλλ(ιω) ιδ, i.e. "April 14, 1442", it was made by the later hand.

Text 
Kurt Aland the Greek text of the codex did not place in any Category. It was not examined by using the Claremont Profile Method.

History
Probably the manuscript was written in Italy. It is dated by the INTF to the 13th-century.

It was presented by Christina, Queen of Sweden, to Cardinal Decio Azzolino, and bought from him by Pope Alexander VII (1689–1691), together with the manuscripts 155, 156, and 181.

It was examined and described by Birch (about 1782), Scholz, and Henry Stevenson. C. R. Gregory saw it in 1886.

It is currently housed at the Vatican Library (Reg. gr. 28), at Rome.

See also
 List of New Testament minuscules
 Biblical manuscript
 Textual criticism

References

Further reading
 

Greek New Testament minuscules
13th-century biblical manuscripts
Manuscripts of the Vatican Library